The  or SE (Super Express), later becoming SSE (Short Super Express), was a "Romancecar" electric multiple unit (EMU) train type operated by the Odakyu Electric Railway in the Tokyo area of Japan. It was the recipient of the inaugural Blue Ribbon Award presented by the Japan Railfan Club in 1958.

Design
The 3000 series trains were articulated with shared bogies, six of which were motored.

Formations

8-car 3000 series SE
The original 8-car "SE" sets were formed as shown below.

The M2 and M7 cars were each fitted with one PT42-K lozenge-type pantograph.

Interior

History
Service first started in 1957 with the SE trainset, which, on a trial run, attained the world speed record at the time (145 km/h) for a narrow gauge train. This record gave impetus for the design of the first Shinkansen, the 0 Series. 

This train adopted Articulated bogie for comfortable, efficiency, economical, and speedup. This feature took over NSE, LSE, HiSE, and VSE trainset.

The 50th anniversary of the Romancecar's narrow gauge world speed record was celebrated on 28 September 2007.

The trains were reformed from eight cars to five in 1968, becoming the 3000 series SSE (Short Super Express).

The SE trains were in service from 1957 to 1968, and the SSE from 1968 to 1991.

References

Electric multiple units of Japan
03000 series SE
Train-related introductions in 1957
Articulated passenger trains
1957 in rail transport
1500 V DC multiple units of Japan
Nippon Sharyo multiple units
Kawasaki multiple units